Timocratica parvifusca is a moth in the family Depressariidae. It was described by Vitor O. Becker in 1982. It is found in Costa Rica.

The wingspan is about 9 mm. The ground colour of the forewings is white. The underside is dark fuscous, with the costa ochreous.

References

Moths described in 1982
Taxa named by Vitor Becker
Timocratica